The Kukryniksy were three caricaturists/cartoonists in the USSR with a recognizable style.

"Kukryniksy" is a collective name, which is derived from the names of three caricaturists Mikhail Kupriyanov (Михаил Васильевич Куприянов, 1903–1991), Porfiri Krylov (Порфирий Никитич Крылов, 1902–1990), and Nikolai Sokolov (Николай Александрович Соколов, 1903–2000) who had met at VKhUTEMAS, a Moscow art school, in the early 1920s. The three began drawing caricatures under the joint signature in 1924.

They became nationally famous in the 1930s after the rise of fascism, drawing for Krokodil, the Moscow satirical paper. They received international recognition for their attacks on Adolf Hitler, Benito Mussolini, Heinrich Himmler, Joseph Goebbels, and Francisco Franco. During the Second World War they established the TASS Windows for political cartoons and posters. After the end of the Second World War they continued to depict politics in their series Cold War (1945—1980s). 

They illustrated a number of books, including Ilf and Petrov's, Nikolay Gogol, Mikhail Saltykov-Shchedrin, Anton Chekhov, Maxim Gorky, Nikolai Leskov, Miguel de Cervantes.

The Kukryniksy are also authors of Socialist Realism-style paintings concerned with historical, political and propaganda topics.

As individuals, they are also known as landscape and portrait artists.

All three were awarded the honorary title of People's Artist of the USSR (1958). They were also recipients of other awards.

There are more than a thousand works of the Kukryniksy in the collection of Alexandre Garese, which have been restored.

References

Books

External links 
 Lambiek Comiclopedia article.
 

 VADS: the online resource for visual arts - Imperial War Museum Posters of Conflict
 Biography of Krylov Porfiry, member of Kukryniksy
 Kukryniksy Caricature Poster Collection
 Kukryniksy, The End
 

Trios
People's Artists of the USSR (visual arts)
Russian caricaturists
Russian editorial cartoonists
Soviet artists
Russian cartoonists
Russian painters
Russian poster artists
Vkhutemas alumni
Collective pseudonyms